Héctor Federico Carballo (born March 14, 1980 in Morón, Argentina) is a retired Argentine footballer.

References

External links
 Profile at BDFA 

1980 births
Living people
Argentine footballers
Argentine expatriate footballers
Ferro Carril Oeste footballers
Boca Juniors footballers
Club Guaraní players
F.C. Motagua players
Kuala Lumpur City F.C. players
Club Almirante Brown footballers
Club Atlético Mitre footballers
CSyD Tristán Suárez footballers
Club Atlético Ituzaingó players
Provincial Osorno footballers
Argentine Primera División players
Paraguayan Primera División players
Chilean Primera División players
Primera B Metropolitana players
Primera Nacional players
Torneo Argentino A players
Liga Nacional de Fútbol Profesional de Honduras players
Expatriate footballers in Chile
Expatriate footballers in Mexico
Expatriate footballers in Honduras
Expatriate footballers in Paraguay
Expatriate footballers in Venezuela
Expatriate footballers in Malaysia
Argentine expatriate sportspeople in Chile
Argentine expatriate sportspeople in Mexico
Argentine expatriate sportspeople in Honduras
Argentine expatriate sportspeople in Paraguay
Argentine expatriate sportspeople in Venezuela
Argentine expatriate sportspeople in Malaysia
Association football defenders